The National Awakening Party, frequently abbreviated to PKB, is an Islam-based political party in Indonesia.

The party was founded in 1999 by the traditionalist strand of Muslim society in Indonesia, which overlaps with the membership of Nahdlatul Ulama. The party is described as a nationalist Muslim party, which promotes inclusive and nationalist principles and upholds Pancasila doctrine.

In 2014, the party obtained 9.04 percent of the popular vote, which is an increase from 4.95 percent in 2009 but lower than 10.57 percent in 2004. The party is currently led by Muhaimin Iskandar.

Origins
The PKB was established on 11 May 1998. Kyai (religious scholars), held a meeting at the Langitan Pesantren (islamic boarding school) to discuss several problems facing Indonesia they deemed to be critical. They developed an official statement, which Kyai Muchid Muzadi of Jember and Gus Yusuf Muhammad, were sent to deliver to President Suharto. Before they were able to deliver the statement, however, Suharto resigned on 21 May 1998.

On 30 May 1998, the Kyai held a grand meeting, or Istighosah, at the office of the East Java branch of the Nahdlatul Ulama (NU) islamic organization. The meeting resulted in KH Cholil Bisri being urged to form a party based on the NU's political aspirations. After initially resisting their request, due to his desire to continue his work with the pesantren, Bisri eventually relented and accepted the leadership role.

A week later, on 6 June, Bisri met the Kyai in order to discuss the formation of the new party.  Invitations had been sent via telephone, and more than 200 Kyai attended the meeting, which was held in Bisri's home in Leteh, Rembang, Central Java. This meeting resulted in the formation of the "Standing Committee", consisting of 11 people, with Bisri as chairman and Gus Yus as secretary. In turn, this committee worked in a marathon session, preparing a platform and party components, including the logos which would become the party's symbol. The logos were created by KH A. Mustofa Bisri.

The Standing Committee and representatives of the NU held a major conference in Bandung, on 4 July 1998, which was attended by 27 regional representatives. In a discussion regarding the name of the organization, the proposed names were the "National Awakening Party", the "Party Kebangkitan Nahdlatul Ummah" and the "Ummah Party". The name chosen was "Partai Kebangkitan Bangsa" (PKB) meaning "National Awakening Party". The party's declaratory was 72 people, representing the age of the NU organization, consisting of the Standing Committee Team (11), the Lajnah Assistance Team (14), Team NU (5), the NU Assistance Team (7), and two Representatives from each of the 27 regions (27 x 2). The 72 founders signed the Party's Platform and its components.

Subsequent to this, however, the PBNU decided that only five people could become the party's declaratory. Those five were Kyai Munasir Ali, Kyai Ilyas Ruchiyat, Kyai Muchid Muzadi, KH A. Mustofa Bisri and KH Abddurahman Wahid, who was the chairman of the PBNU. The 72 names of the party's original declaratory were erased by the PBNU.

The party's base of support is strongest in Java Island and draws from the constituency that formerly supported the conservative Muslim organization NU. The PKB differs from Nahdlatul Ulama in that while it supports a role for Islam in government, it does not share the older organization's support for an explicitly Islamic republic.

General elections
The National Awakening Party stood in the 1999 elections, winning 13 percent of the votes. In the 2004 elections, the party gained 10.57% (11,989,564) of votes and 52 seats in the People's Representative Council. However, the party won only 4.9 percent of the votes in the 2009 legislative election, and 27 seats in the legislature.

Policies
According to the party website, the party's policies are to:
 Strengthen democracy to increase the prosperity of people living in villages
 Strengthen the protection of farmers and fishermen
 Accelerate the development of disadvantaged regions
 Make labourers prosperous
 Increase the involvement of women in strategic sectors

For the 2014 elections, the party plans to focus more intensively on its policies related to villages, in particular such as village representation, the allocation of funding for villages and the development of education and health facilities.

Election results

Legislative election results

Presidential election results

References

1998 establishments in Indonesia
Centrist parties in Asia
Conservative parties in Asia
Islamic democratic political parties
Islamic political parties in Indonesia
Liberal and progressive movements within Islam
Liberal parties in Indonesia
Nahdlatul Ulama
Pancasila political parties
Political parties established in 1998
Social conservative parties